Cacia elegans is a species of longhorn beetles of the subfamily Lamiinae.

References

External links

 
 Cacia elegans at Biolib.cz, retrieved on 21 August 2016

Cacia (beetle)
Beetles described in 1939